Arachnogyaritus celestini is a species of beetle in the family Cerambycidae, and the type species of its genus. It was described by Gouverneur and Vitali in 2016. It is known from Laos.

References

Gyaritini
Beetles described in 2016